Bulletproof is a 2020 documentary film exploring the culture of fear that has developed at schools as a response to the perceived threat of school shootings and the industry that has developed to market products to secure schools. Filmed in Chicago, it was released June 21, 2020 in the United States.

Awards and nominations

References

External links
 Official website
 

2020 documentary films
2020 films
American documentary films
2020s English-language films
2020s American films